DARVO (an acronym for "deny, attack, and reverse victim and offender") is a reaction that perpetrators of wrongdoing, particularly sexual offenders, may display in response to being held accountable for their behavior.  Some researchers indicate that it is a common manipulation strategy of psychological abusers.

As the acronym suggests, the common steps involved are 1) the abuser denies the abuse ever took place, 2) when confronted with evidence, the abuser then attacks the person that was abused (and/or the person's family and/or friends) for attempting to hold the abuser accountable for their actions, and finally 3) the abuser claims that they are actually the victim in the situation, thus reversing the positions of victim and offender. It often involves not just "playing the victim" but also victim blaming.

Origins 
The acronym and the analysis it is based on are the work of the psychologist Jennifer Freyd, who wrote about it in 1997. The first stage of DARVO, denial, involves gaslighting.

Freyd writes:

Usage and effectiveness 
Freyd stated that DARVO is frequently used and effective, although the number of people who are inclined to believe a DARVO response decreases once they understand the tactic.

Examples 
Alleged examples of DARVO include:
 The behavior of R. Kelly during an interview related to criminal proceedings against him for sexual abuse of minors
 The behavior of former United States President Donald Trump in defending himself against sexual harassment allegations, as well as in defending himself against allegations of his other wrongdoings.
 The Iğdır Genocide Memorial and Museum, a memorial-museum complex which promotes Armenian genocide denial, and defends Turkey against allegations of  massacring Armenians, by claiming that during World War I, it was the Armenians who killed Turks rather than vice versa.
 The behavior of Brett Kavanaugh during his senate confirmation hearing in relation to sexual assault allegations against him by Christine Blasey Ford.

In popular media
In the 2019 episode "Season Finale" of South Park, Randy Marsh is arrested for destroying home-growers' marijuana. Randy calls President Garrison for legal advice. The President explains to him DARVO and role-plays how to use it. When Randy attempts to do so, the policemen he tries it on inform him that the tactic will not work, as Randy is not the President.

See also 
 Crocodile tears
Gaslighting
 Tu quoque

References 

Abuse
Psychological abuse
Psychological manipulation